Andrei Gennadyevich Zvagolskiy (born 19 March 1984) is a former Russian professional football player.

Club career
Zvagolskiy played one season in the Russian Football National League, appearing in 18 league matches for FC Zvezda Irkutsk.

External links
 
 

1984 births
Living people
Russian footballers
Association football forwards
FC Lada-Tolyatti players
FC Okean Nakhodka players
FC Vityaz Podolsk players
FC Zvezda Irkutsk players
FC Irtysh Omsk players
FC Sakhalin Yuzhno-Sakhalinsk players
FC Rubin Kazan players